The MV Forth Hope is a medical ferry operated by the Vine Trust as part of the charity's Amazon Hope project. The ship operates on the Amazon River from a base in Iquitos in Peru.

History
The Forth Hope was originally built in 2002 by Abels Shipbuilders of Bristol, England for the Gosport Ferry Company Ltd. She is a twin sister ship to the Spirit of Gosport, a passenger ferry also built by Abels, that connects Gosport and Portsmouth on England's south coast. Forth Hope was intended to be named Spirit of Portsmouth and operate alongside her sister. However she was only partially constructed when the ferry company cancelled the order, and she was never given her intended  name, which was eventually reused for a subsequent Spirit of Portsmouth built by VT Halmatic. The unfinished vessel remained at Abel's shipyard in Bristol Harbour for many years, until it was finally completed in 2016.

After completion, the vessel was moved to Rosyth Dockyard on the Firth of Forth via the Irish Sea and Caledonian Canal, before being outfitted by Babcock Marine for her new role as a medical ship. In May 2017 the ship was formally named Forth Hope by the Princess Royal, who is patron of the Vine Trust. The vessel was again visited by the Princess Royal in September 2017, this time whilst she was moored at the Peruvian village of Oran.

Characteristics
In her medical missionary role, she is equipped with consultation rooms, an operating theatre, laboratory, pharmacy, and dental surgery.

The vessel flys a Cayman Islands flag, it has a draught of 1.9 metres, is 35 metres long and 10 metres in breadth, with a maximum speed of 7.1 knots.

References

External links

Forth Hope
Forth Hope
Missionary ships